Louis Romand (16 May 1934 – 19 June 2000) was a French biathlete. He competed in the 20 km individual event at the 1968 Winter Olympics.

References

External links
 

1934 births
2000 deaths
French male biathletes
Olympic biathletes of France
Biathletes at the 1968 Winter Olympics
Sportspeople from Jura (department)